Bill Chalker is an Australian author and UFO researcher. 
He is a contributing editor for the International UFO Reporter and has been the Australian representative for the Aerial Phenomena Research Organisation (1978 to 1986) and a New South Wales state representative for the Mutual UFO Network (1976 to 1993).

Biography
Chalker was born in Grafton, New South Wales in 1952. He studied at the University of New England, receiving a degree in chemistry and mathematics.

Bibliography

References

"Bill Chalker, the Aussie X-Files agent who says the aliens have landed", The Daily Telegraph, March 25, 2010
Chalker, Bill. Hair of the Alien: DNA and Other Forensic Evidence for Alien Abductions.(Brief Article)(Book Review) Booklist, v.101, no.21, 2005 July, p. 1880
"Australia loses UFO documents", UPI NewsTrack, 2011 June 9. Quote by Chalker as UFO expert. 
"Up-to-date aliens grey not green, experts tell UFO fans.", Asia Africa Intelligence Wire (Financial Times), 2002 August 5. Quote by Chalker as UFO expert.
"UFOs leaving traces UFOs leaving traces." Hornsby and Upper North Shore Advocate (New South Wales, Australia). (May 20, 2010) News: p14
"Space oddity." Hills Shire Times (New South Wales, Australia). (May 11, 2010) News: p1. 
"UFO sighting probed." Macarthur Chronicle (New South Wales, Australia). (Mar. 30, 2010) News: p7.
"Division over UFOs." mX Sydney (New South Wales, Australia). (Mar. 24, 2010) News: p5.
"Close encounters." The Sun-Herald (Sydney, Australia). (Feb. 21, 2010) News: p5.
"Spike", Sydney Morning Herald, 04/24/2001
"THE TRUTH IS OUT THERE." Daily Telegraph (Sydney, New South Wales, Australia). (July 20, 1996) Regional News: p034
"Revealed: SA's alien spaceship secrets; New book tells of; our close encounters." The Sunday Mail (Adelaide, South Australia, Australia). (July 21, 1996) News: p030. 
"Family's terror in Nullarbor incident." The Sunday Mail (Adelaide, South Australia, Australia). (July 21, 1996) News: p030. Quote: "Bill Chalker is the only researcher given access to government UFO files."
"UFO FILES." The Sunday Mail (QLD) (Brisbane, Queensland, Australia). (Aug. 11, 1996) News: p068.
"STRANGER THAN FICTION." The Australian (National, Australia). (Dec. 11, 1996) Regional News: pB12.

External links
http://www.auforn.com/Bcintro.htm
http://theozfiles.blogspot.ca/
http://authors.simonandschuster.ca/Bill-Chalker/22509695
http://www.forteantimes.com/strangedays/ufofiles/516/bill_chalkers_ufo_top_ten.html
http://www.project1947.com/forum/bcbiog.htm

Ufologists
Living people
1952 births
Australian writers
People from Grafton, New South Wales
University of New England (Australia) alumni